In graph theory, the shortness exponent is a numerical parameter of a family of graphs that measures how far from Hamiltonian the graphs in the family can be. Intuitively, if  is the shortness exponent of a graph family , then every -vertex graph in the family has a cycle of length near  but some graphs do not have longer cycles. More precisely, for any ordering of the graphs in  into a sequence , with  defined to be the length of the longest cycle in graph , the shortness exponent is defined as

This number is always in the interval from 0 to 1; it is 1 for families of graphs that always contain a Hamiltonian or near-Hamiltonian cycle, and 0 for families of graphs in which the longest cycle length can be smaller than any constant power of the number of vertices.

A construction based on kleetopes shows that some polyhedral graphs have longest cycle length , while it has also been proven that every polyhedral graph contains a cycle of length . The polyhedral graphs are the graphs that are simultaneously planar and 3-vertex-connected; the assumption of 3-vertex-connectivity is necessary for these results, as there exist sets of 2-vertex-connected planar graphs (such as the complete bipartite graphs ) with shortness exponent 0. There are many additional known results on shortness exponents of restricted subclasses of planar and polyhedral graphs.

The 3-vertex-connected cubic graphs (without the restriction that they be planar) also have a shortness exponent that has been proven to lie strictly between 0 and 1.

References

Hamiltonian paths and cycles